Orrin Dean Griffing (1915 – 1998) was an American gridiron football player, coach, and executive. He played as a center and linebacker for the Kansas State University in 1933 and 1934, for the Regina Roughriders from 1936 to 1943, for Toronto Balmy Beach Beachers in 1944, and the Calgary Stampeders from 1945 to 1947; the last he also part owned.  Griffing was inducted into the Canadian Football Hall of Fame in 1965.  He coached Saskatchewan during the mid-1950s. In 1960, Griffing became the first general manager of the Denver Broncos, selected in part because of his known and needed frugality. He was responsible for the team's unappealing brown and yellow uniform and ugly socks, which he had bought secondhand from a high school all-star game. He later worked as special assignment scout for the Chicago Bears.

Griffing died in 1998 in Sarasota, Florida.

References

1915 births
1998 deaths
American football centers
American players of Canadian football
Canadian football offensive linemen
Calgary Stampeders coaches
Calgary Stampeders players
Denver Broncos executives
Kansas State Wildcats football players
Ontario Rugby Football Union players
Saskatchewan Roughriders coaches
Saskatchewan Roughriders general managers
Saskatchewan Roughriders players
Toronto Balmy Beach Beachers players
Canadian Football Hall of Fame inductees
People from Pottawatomie County, Kansas
Players of American football from Kansas